The Armenian Baseball Federation, also known as the Armenian Baseball and Sօftball Federation (ABSF), is the regulating body of baseball and softball in Armenia, governed by the Armenian Olympic Committee. The headquarters of the federation is located in Yerevan.

About
The Armenian Baseball Federation was established in 2005 and is currently led by president Arman Yavryan. Armenian baseball athletes participate in various international and European level baseball championships. The Federation also hosts national baseball competitions and manages the Armenia national baseball team. The Federation is a full member of the World Baseball Softball Confederation, WBSC Europe, and the International Softball Federation.

See also
 Sport in Armenia

References

External links 
 Official website
 Armenian Baseball Federation on Facebook

Sports governing bodies in Armenia
Sports organizations established in 2005
Baseball governing bodies in Europe
Softball organizations